The Sport 2000 80 is an Italian paramotor that was designed by Pietrucci Mauro and produced by Sport 2000 of Capena for powered paragliding. Now out of production, when it was available the aircraft was supplied complete and ready-to-fly.

Design and development
The model 80 was designed to comply with the US FAR 103 Ultralight Vehicles rules as well as European regulations. It features a paraglider-style wing, single-place accommodation and a single  Vittorazi 80 cc engine in pusher configuration. The aircraft is built from a combination of bolted aluminium and 4130 steel tubing.

The use of the very small and lightweight Vittorazi engine was hampered by the long development time, early reliability issues and the subsequent death of the engine designer.

As is the case with all paramotors, take-off and landing is accomplished by foot. Inflight steering is accomplished via handles that actuate the canopy brakes, creating roll and yaw.

Variants
80 AM
Model with a  Vittorazi 80 cc engine in pusher configuration with a 4:1 ratio reduction drive and a  diameter two-bladed wooden propeller.
80 LM
Model with a  Vittorazi 80 cc engine in pusher configuration with a 4:1 ratio reduction drive and a  diameter two-bladed wooden propeller. The fuel tank capacity is increased over the AM model to give 3.2-3.5 hours endurance.

Specifications (Model 80 AM)

References

80
2000s Italian ultralight aircraft
Single-engined pusher aircraft
Paramotors